Te Puna is a rural community near Tauranga in the Bay of Plenty region of New Zealand's North Island. It is located on State Highway 2, north of Bethlehem and south of Katikati.

The local Te Puna Quarry has been redeveloped by volunteers into a park.

Te Puna has three marae belonging to the Ngāti Ranginui hapū of Pirirākau: Paparoa Marae and Werahiko meeting house, Poutūterangi Marae and Takurua meeting house, and Tutereinga Marae and meeting house.

Former National Party leader Todd Muller was raised in Te Puna in the 1970s, where his parents started a kiwifruit orchard. He attended Te Puna Primary School. He entered parliament at the 2014 general election as the MP for Bay of Plenty, and was National Party leader and the Leader of the Opposition from 22 May to 14 July 2020.

Demographics

Te Puna statistical area had a population of 2,262 at the 2018 New Zealand census, an increase of 249 people (12.4%) since the 2013 census, and an increase of 258 people (12.9%) since the 2006 census. There were 744 households, comprising 1,161 males and 1,101 females, giving a sex ratio of 1.05 males per female. The median age was 45.2 years (compared with 37.4 years nationally), with 435 people (19.2%) aged under 15 years, 375 (16.6%) aged 15 to 29, 1,110 (49.1%) aged 30 to 64, and 342 (15.1%) aged 65 or older.

Ethnicities were 74.3% European/Pākehā, 32.5% Māori, 1.9% Pacific peoples, 2.4% Asian, and 0.9% other ethnicities. People may identify with more than one ethnicity.

The percentage of people born overseas was 13.4, compared with 27.1% nationally.

Although some people chose not to answer the census's question about religious affiliation, 43.4% had no religion, 43.5% were Christian, 4.2% had Māori religious beliefs, 0.3% were Hindu, 0.7% were Buddhist and 1.3% had other religions.

Of those at least 15 years old, 396 (21.7%) people had a bachelor's or higher degree, and 225 (12.3%) people had no formal qualifications. The median income was $36,400, compared with $31,800 nationally. 399 people (21.8%) earned over $70,000 compared to 17.2% nationally. The employment status of those at least 15 was that 933 (51.1%) people were employed full-time, 369 (20.2%) were part-time, and 54 (3.0%) were unemployed.

Education

References

Western Bay of Plenty District
Populated places in the Bay of Plenty Region
Populated places around the Tauranga Harbour